Zawarib, Al-Zawarib, Zouarib is a village in Akkar Governorate, Lebanon, situated on a hill above the Akkar valley and overlooking the Mediterranean Sea. Zawarib is surrounded by the village of Miniara from the South and Sheik Taba from the North.

History
In 1838, Eli Smith noted  the village,  whose inhabitants were Greek Orthodox, located west of esh-Sheikh Mohammed.

Social life
The village population is around 1000 many of them live outside Lebanon. 283 persons voted in the 2009 municipal elections to elect 9 village council members.
All the village residents are Christians with a majority of Greek-Orthodox.

Families
The major families in Zawarib are: Naddour, Matar, Nader, Farah, Farfour, Saoud, Chahoud, Wehbe, Fakhoury, Habib, Daas, Greige, Nabout and Tohme.

Education and Employment
There is a relatively high literacy in the village. A few prominent Ph.D. holders, and much more Master’s degrees holders especially among the young generation. The most prominent intellectual personality from Zawarib is Dr. Suheil Farah, a professor in history who was the first foreigner to be granted the highest award of the Russian Academy and a nominee for Nobel Peace Prize in 2018. Other occupations include: Doctors, lawyers, teachers, engineers, and employees in the public sector. Many of the poorly educated youth are enrolled in the Lebanese Army and Internal Security Forces with many highly ranked officers among them.

References

Bibliography

External links
 Zouarib, Localiban

Populated places in Akkar District
Eastern Orthodox Christian communities in Lebanon